The Dapu Road Tunnel, formerly Huangpu River Tunnel or Project 651, is a road tunnel that runs under the Huangpu River in the city of Shanghai, China. It connects Huangpu District on the Puxi side of Shanghai with Pudong New Area. It consists of two tubes, the first of which was constructed between 1965 and 1970 and acted as the first vehicular tunnel underneath the Huangpu River in. The tunnel has two lanes and originally operated with one lane in each direction. Due to the need for greater capacity brought on by Shanghai's Expo 2010, a second tube was built between 2009 and 2010 just to the west of the first, opening on February11, 2010. When the second tube opened, the first tube was converted for northbound traffic only while the new tube carried southbound traffic.

References

Buildings and structures in Shanghai
Road tunnels in China
Transport in Shanghai